The Hob Holes are caves in the cliffs of Runswick Bay which resulted from mining for jet – fossilised wood which is valuable as a gemstone. A hobgoblin was reputed to live there.

References

 Caves of North Yorkshire
Hobgoblins